Congriscus maldivensis is an eel in the family Congridae (conger/garden eels). It was described by John Roxborough Norman in 1939, originally under the genus Conger. It is a marine, deep water-dwelling eel which is known from the Indo-Western Pacific, including Australia, Fiji, Madagascar, Maldives (from which its species epithet is derived), New Caledonia, the Philippines, Vanuatu, and Wallis and Futuna. It dwells at a depth range of 354–820 metres. It can reach a maximum standard length of 35.2 centimetres.

References

Congridae
Fish of the Indian Ocean
Fish of the Pacific Ocean
Fish described in 1939
Taxa named by John Roxborough Norman